Long Point Ecological Reserve is an ecological reserve located on the west shore of Lake Winnipeg, Manitoba, Canada. It was established in 1987 under the Manitoba Ecological Reserves Act.

See also
 List of ecological reserves in Manitoba
 List of protected areas of Manitoba

References

External links
 iNaturalist: Long Point Ecological Reserve

Protected areas established in 1987
Ecological reserves of Manitoba
Nature reserves in Manitoba
Protected areas of Manitoba